Orijen is a premium brand of dog food and cat food manufactured in Alberta, Canada and Kentucky by Champion Petfoods. Founded in 1985 by Reinhard Muhlenfeld, Orijen pet foods are currently sold in 70 countries.

Varieties
There are ten varieties - seven dog and three cat dry food formulas. 
 Puppy
 Puppy Large
 Adult Dog
 6 Fish Dog
 Regional Red Dog
 Tundra
 Senior Dog
 Cat & Kitten
 6 Fish Cat
 Regional Red Cat

They also make three varieties of Freeze-Dried Foods and thirteen varieties of Freeze-Dried treats - eight dog and five cat.

Sale to Mars foods
In 2023 the Mars pet food company is buying out Champion, the parent company of Orijen

References

External links
 

Pet food brands
Companies based in Edmonton
Cat food manufacturers originating in Canada